The Croatian National Theatre is a theatre building in Osijek, capital of the Croatian region of Slavonia.

Opened in 1866, and the building was expanded and fully completed in 1907 according to the plans of its local architect, Karlo Klausner. Designed in baroque style and exterior, it was damaged by the JNA during the Croatian War of Independence in the 1990s, and has been extensively restored. The theatre was officially re-opened by then-President of Croatia, Franjo Tuđman in December 1994.

A McDonald's restaurant occupies the street-front area of the theatre.

External links 

Theatres in Osijek
1866 establishments in Croatia
Establishments in the Kingdom of Croatia (Habsburg)